The Roman Catholic Church in Cape Verde is composed only of a Latin hierarchy, comprising two exempt dioceses, which depend directly on the Hole See, not partaking in any Ecclesiastical province. As this warrants no national Episcopal Conference, the episcopate of (ex-Portuguese) Cape Verde sits in the West African (francophone & lusophone) transnational Conférence des Evêques du Sénégal, de la Mauritanie, du Cap-Vert et de Guinée-Bissau with Senegal, Mauretania and Guinea-Bissau (all ex-French).

There are no Eastern Catholic, pre-diocesan or other non-provincial jurisdictions.

There are no titular sees. All defunct jurisdictions have current successor sees.

There formally is an Apostolic Nunciature (papal diplomatic representation at embassy-level) to Cape Verde, but it is vested in the Apostolic Nunciature to Senegal, in its capital Dakar.

Current Latin dioceses

Immediately subject to the Holy See 
 Roman Catholic Diocese of Mindelo
 Roman Catholic Diocese of Santiago de Cabo Verde

See also 
 List of Catholic dioceses (structured view)
 Catholic Church in Cape Verde

Sources and external links 
 GCatholic.org - data for all sections.
 Catholic-Hierarchy entry.

Cape Verde
Catholic dioceses